Gaylord Damian "Gay" Bryan (May 1, 1927 – April 25, 2015) was a male long and triple jumper from the United States, who competed in the 1940s and 1950s for his native country. Bryan set his personal best in the men's long jump event (7.74 metres) on April 9, 1949, at a meet in Westwood. He failed to qualify for the Summer Olympics (1948 and 1952) during his career. He won the gold medal in the long jump at the 1951 Pan American Games and was a four-time national champion in the triple jump.

Bryan competed collegiately for Stanford University and is a member of the school's Athletic Hall of Fame.

Achievements

References

Profile

1927 births
2015 deaths
American male long jumpers
American male triple jumpers
Athletes (track and field) at the 1951 Pan American Games
Stanford Cardinal men's track and field athletes
Pan American Games medalists in athletics (track and field)
Pan American Games gold medalists for the United States
Medalists at the 1951 Pan American Games